Châteaulin is a commune in the Finistère department and administrative region of Brittany in north-western France. It is a sub-prefecture of the department.

Geography
Châteaulin is located in a valley towards the center of the Finistère. Situated on the Aulne River, also Canal de Nantes à Brest there, Châteaulin is centrally located between Quimper to the south and Brest to the North. To the West, the Menez-Hom hills separate it from the Crozon peninsula and the Bay of Douarnenez which leads into the Atlantic Ocean.

Population
In French the inhabitants of Châteaulin are known as Châteaulinois.

Breton language
In 2008, 1.96% of primary-school children attended bilingual schools.

Economy
Châteaulin's economy rests on the twin bedrocks of food processing (salmon and poultry) and, to an ever-greater extent, tourism. The Gendarmerie school on the outskirts of the town provides for a large number of families and the many recruits passing through the school provide the economic backbone of the town's night-life.
A cake shop is also well known within the area of Châteaulin,"Histoire de Macaron" is famous thanks to its tasty and wide range of macarons as well as the Java, created in 1907 by Mister Le Meur, which is a legend in the city.

Personalities
Yves Marie André, better known as le Père André (1675–1764), Jesuit priest and philosopher.
27 November 1761 : Birth of Julien Marie Cosmao-Kerjulien (died in Brest 17 February 1825), Rear-Admiral and Baron d'Empire.
Jean Moulin, emblem of the French Resistance during the Second World War, was the sub-prefect from 1930 to 1933.
Henri Ernest Ponthier de Chamaillard, usually known as Ernest de Chamaillard, (9 December 1862, Gourlizon – 1931, Eaubonne) was a French artist, one of a group of painters who gathered in the Breton village of Pont-Aven. He was a friend and student of Paul Gauguin. In 1893, unable to make a living from his painting, he moved to Châteaulin behind  Église Saint-Idunet where he worked as a lawyer until 1905.

International relations
Châteaulin is twinned with:
    -  Clonakilty, County Cork, Ireland.
  - Grimmen, Mecklenburg-Vorpommern, Germany

See also
Cantons of the Finistère department
Communes of the Finistère department
Arrondissements of the Finistère department
Parc naturel régional d'Armorique

References

External links
Official website of the town of Châteaulin / Kastellin (in French)

Communes of Finistère
Subprefectures in France